Cattle Call Inc. is a Japanese game developer based in Tokyo, Japan. The company was established by former staff of Data East Corporation and is engaged in developing original console games as well as co-developing and porting games for other game companies.

The company is known for developing the (partially) Japan-exclusive Metal Max series and the 3DS role-playing games The Legend of Legacy and its sequel, The Alliance Alive.

History 
In 1998, Data East Corporation, a Japanese video game and electronic engineering company based in Tokyo, withdrew entirely from the arcade industry and reported a total debt estimated at ¥3.3 billion. The company then filed for reorganization in the following year and stopped making video games altogether. As a result of the corporate reorganization, some of the staff from the company formed Cattle Call Inc. to continue developing video games.

Games developed by Cattle Call

PlayStation 2

Nintendo DS

Nintendo 3DS

Wii

PlayStation 3

PlayStation 4

References 

Video game companies of Japan
Video game development companies
Video game companies established in 1998
Japanese companies established in 1998
Software companies based in Tokyo